"Penny Lover" is the title of the fifth and final single released from Lionel Richie's multi-platinum 1983 album, Can't Slow Down. The song was written by Richie and his then-wife, Brenda Harvey Richie.  

As with all the other singles taken from Can't Slow Down ("All Night Long (All Night)", "Running with the Night", "Hello" and "Stuck on You"), "Penny Lover" was a top ten hit on the Billboard Hot 100 chart, spending two weeks at No. 8 in December 1984. The song reached an identical No. 8 peak position on the Billboard R&B chart, while on the Billboard Adult Contemporary chart, the song logged four weeks at No. 1. On the UK Singles Chart, the song reached number 18. In Canada, it peaked at No. 12 on the RPM singles chart.

In a song review printed in Billboard by an anonymous writer in 1984, "Penny Lover" was described as "another of his unfailingly effective universal-appeal ballads".

Music video
The music video was directed by Bob Giraldi, who had also directed "Running with the Night" and "Hello".

Track listings
7" single
 "Penny Lover" – 3:46
 "Tell Me" – 4:06

12" single
 "Penny Lover" – 5:33
 "You Are" – 5:03
 "My Love" – 4:05

Charts

Weekly charts

Year-end charts

Other versions
Jamaican reggae duo Sly and Robbie covered the song in 1997, from their album Friends. It features singer Ambelique, and the song also appears on his 1997 album Sings the Classics. The single reached No. 94 on the UK Singles Chart.

See also
List of number-one adult contemporary singles of 1984 (U.S.)

References

External links
 Single release info at Discogs

 MetroLyrics See History

1983 songs
1984 singles
Lionel Richie songs
1997 singles
Sly and Robbie songs
Music videos directed by Bob Giraldi
Songs written by Lionel Richie
Motown singles
Song recordings produced by James Anthony Carmichael